Microgymnomma is a genus of parasitic flies in the family Tachinidae. There are at least two described species in Microgymnomma.

Species
These two species belong to the genus Microgymnomma:
 Microgymnomma orbitalis Townsend, 1916
 Microgymnomma paulensis Townsend, 1929

References

Further reading

 
 
 
 

Tachinidae
Articles created by Qbugbot